This article refers to crime in the U.S. state of Nevada.

Statistics
In 2014 there were 92,583 crimes reported in Nevada, including 170 murders.

Capital punishment laws

Capital punishment is applied in this state.

References